Lieutenant General Gert Johannes Jacob Boshoff SSAS SD SM (28 April 1931 - 22 October 2014) was a South African Army general.

He attended school at  Barberton High School in the Eastern Transvaal but left at the age of 15 before joining the Post Office, later completing his Matric at the Pretoria Technical College in 1948 through evening classes.

In 1950 he started working for the City Council of Pretoria, and also joined the Citizen Force where he became part of 6 Signal Squadron.

As a Colonel he was appointed as Director Signals at Army HQ (26 January 1968 – 31 December 1972), and then promoted to Brigadier from 1 November 1968. On 4 December 1972 he was appointed OC North West Command. On 1 December 1974 he was promoted to the rank of Major General and appointed Chief of Army Staff Logistics. He was appointed Deputy Chief of Staff Personnel on 1 January 1979 and later that year on 1 December 1979 he was promoted to the rank of Lieutenant General in the position of Chief of Staff Personnel from 1 February 1980 till his retirement on 31 January 1981.

References

South African Army generals
People from Benoni
1931 births
2014 deaths